This Flat Earth is a 2018 play by Lindsey Ferrentino. The play officially opened Off-Broadway at Playwrights Horizons in March of 2018. In The New York Times, Ben Brantley described it as, "Lindsey Ferrentino's most daring play to date, with profound and essential subjects. There is no denying the urgency of this work." It received the Edgerton Foundation New Play Award.

Plot 

This Flat Earth is a contemporary play about Julie and Zander, two twelve year olds who try to make sense of the world when the unthinkable - a school shooting - occurs at their middle school.

References 

Off-Broadway plays
2018 plays